John Hamilton was a Scottish footballer who played as a goalkeeper and defender for Spanish club FC Barcelona. The dates of his birth and death are unknown.

Although little has been recorded of his life, he was one of the most important figures in the amateur beginnings of football in Catalonia, being noted for his prominent role in promoting football in the city and as the main driving force of Escocès FC, a team made up of Scottish workers from a Sant Andreu factory, which he served as its captain. He was a member of the side that won the very first official title in Spanish football, the 1900–01 Copa Macaya with Hispania AC. And in addition to being a player, he was also a referee, overseeing at least one match in the 1900–01 Copa Macaya, tens of Catalan championship games, the 1912 Copa del Rey Final, and being the first president of the Catalan Referees' Association in 1902.

Early life
John Hamilton was born in Scotland somewhere in the early-1870s. At some point in the early 1890s, he became an employee at lace manufacturers Johnston, Shields & Co in Glasgow. In 1893, he was sent over to work in the company's newly opened factory at Sant Martí de Provençals, known in Catalonia as La Escocesa.

Playing career

Escocès FC
Whilst out in the Catalan capital, Hamilton developed a deep interest in football, which he played in his free time with his friends and co-workers. During the winter of 1893–94, he took part in some of the very first football matches played in the Catalan capital, when he featured in clashes between the Scottish Colony of Sant Martí and the English Colony of Barcelona. The Barcelona press reported matches between these two sides played on 8 December 1893, 11 March, and 15 April 1894, however, due to the little statistical rigor that the newspapers had at that time, very little is known about those matches, and thus the amount of goals he scored (if any) remains unclear. During this period, Hamilton stood out as a great goal scorer, but as he aged he moved on to play as a goalkeeper. He also stood out for his strong character on the pitch and great leadership skills, which would later earn him the captaincy of Escocès FC.

This Sant Martí team was the forerunner of the Escocès FC, which was formed by Scottish workers from a factory in Sant Andreu de Palomar in January 1900, and of which Hamilton was one of the founders. He and defender Jim Dykes were the only members of this group who had previously played a game in the city, having covered the losses of Team Anglès in a match against FC Barcelona on 6 January 1900, keeping a clean-sheet in a 3–0 win. As such, and also due to his higher experience and leadership skills, Hamilton was named the team's captain in a time when the captain had the duty of dictating the tactics to be followed (since the coach as we know him today did not exist back then) and was in charge of orienting the team and making up the line-ups. In addition to Hamilton and Gold, this team also had the likes of Peter Mauchan, the Black brothers (Alenxader and Joseph) and Geordie Girvan, with all of them, except for Gold, going on to play for FC Barcelona. This team played ten friendlies in 1900 against the likes of Barça, Català FC and Hispania AC, and he started in 9 of them, six as the goalkeeper and three as a defender, missing one only because he was the referee of that match, which was against FC Catalá on 25 February 1900, ending in a 1–5 win for the Scots.

Hispania AC
On November 1900, Escocés FC folded and Hispania AC took advantage of its dissolution to incorporate several of its most prominent players, such as Hamilton, Gold and Black, while Mauchan and Girvan joined FC Barcelona. Two months later, Hispania AC organized the first edition of the Copa Macaya in 1901, which was the first football championship played on the Iberian Peninsula, and the forerunner for the Catalan championship which began in 1903. With Hispania, Hamilton was forced to play as a right-sided defender, owing to the club already having an established goalkeeper, Samuel Morris, who had also played for Team Anglès in 1899. However, he thrived in his new role and enjoyed a great goalscoring form, netting 7 goals in total, although six of them come in a 14–0 trashing of Franco-Española. Together with captain Gustavo Green, Joseph Black and Samuel Morris, Hamilton played a pivotal role in helping Hispania become the very first Spanish club to win an official title. These seven goals saw him finish as the fourth highest top scorer of the tournament behind Parsons (8), Green (9) and Juan Gamper (31). Interestingly, Hamilton was involved in another 14–0 trashing of Franco-Española at the tournament, but as a referee and perpetuated by Barcelona at Hotel Casanovas.

FC Barcelona
He remained loyal to the club until 19 November 1903, the day in which the entity's board agreed to its dissolution due to a lack of players. Most of the remaining players, including Hamilton and Black, joined FC Barcelona, thus becoming one of the first Scottish players to wear the Barça shirt along with his fellow Escocès FC teammates. Despite the absence of Samuel, Hamilton kept playing as a defender, and he also kept thriving in that position, and together with the likes of José Quirante, Romà Forns, Udo Steinberg and Carles Comamala, he helped Barça win the 1904–05 Catalan championship.

Refereeing career
Hamilton began his refereeing career in 1900, when he was still an active player at Escocès FC, overseeing one of the games of the said club against FC Catalá on 25 February 1900. He then oversaw a match between Barcelona and Franco-Española on 7 April 1901. In 1902 the Official College of Catalan Referees was created by Catalan Football Federation, and Hamilton from Hispania was elected as the entity's first-ever president.

After ending his playing career, Hamilton became a referee full-time, whose most important task was to referee the matches of the Catalan championship, and if available, the Copa del Rey. In fact, he refereed tens of championship matches and he was the referee of the 1912 Copa del Rey Final between FC Barcelona and Sociedad Gimnástica, which ended in a 2–0 victory in favor of his former club.

Honours

Club
Hispania AC
 Copa Macaya:
 Champions: 1900–01

FC Barcelona
 Catalan championship:
 Champions: 1904–05

References

Year of birth missing
Year of death missing
Scottish footballers
Association football forwards
FC Barcelona players
Scottish expatriate sportspeople in Spain
Expatriate footballers in Spain
Scottish expatriate footballers